The men's team pursuit in the 2014–15 ISU Speed Skating World Cup was contested over three races on three occasions, out of a total of seven World Cup occasions for the season, with the first occasion taking place in Obihiro, Japan, on 14–16 November 2014, and the last occasion taking place in Heerenveen, Netherlands, on 12–14 December 2014.

The defending champions were the Netherlands.

The South Korean team won the cup after having collected silver medals in the first two competitions, and a gold medal in the final competition.

Top three

Race medallists

Standings 
Standings as of 12 December 2014 (end of the season).

References 

 
Men team pursuit